Proliferodiscus is a genus of fungi within the Hyaloscyphaceae family. The genus contains seven species.

References

External links
Proliferodiscus at Index Fungorum

Hyaloscyphaceae